The following events related to sociology occurred in the 1850s.

1850

Events
Karl Marx The Class Struggles in France is published.

1851

Events
Herbert Spencer's Social Statics is published.

1852

Events
Karl Marx's The Eighteenth Brumaire of Louis Bonaparte is published.

Births
August 23: Arnold Toynbee

1854

Events
Auguste Comte's The System of Positive Philosophy is published.

1855

Events
Søren Kierkegaard's Attack Upon Christendom is published.
Pierre Guillaume Frédéric le Play's Les Ouvriers européens is published.

1856

Events
Pierre Guillaume Frédéric le Play founds the Société internationale des études pratiques d'économie sociale.

1857

Events
Karl Marx's Grundrisse is written (but not published until 1941).

1859

Events
Karl Marx's A Contribution to a Critique of Political Economy is published.

Sociology
Sociology timelines